B. Venkata Raghavulu is an Indian communist politician. He was the State Secretary of the last unified Andhra Pradesh State Committee of the Communist Party of India (Marxist), till its bifurcation in March 2014 following the bifurcation of the state. He is also a Polit Buro member of that party.

Early life
CPI (M) State Secretary B V Raghavulu was born to Venkata Subbaiah and Punnamma couple in Pedamopadu village in Prakasam district of Andhra Pradesh. Raghavulu completed his schooling.  Later, he joined Andhra Christian College in Guntur for his intermediate education.  Then, he went to Bapatla and joined Bachelor of Science at the Bapatla Agricultural College.  For various reasons, he was compelled to drop out of the course. Afterwards, he joined Kavali College for Bachelor of Arts course. When he was pursuing his final year course of graduation, emergency was declared in the country. After appearing for the final examinations, he left for Nellore as a full-time activist of the party.

Political career
During the emergency period, many top leaders of the party were either arrested or went underground themselves. This gave an opportunity to Raghavulu to manage the party office at his best. The party later, during emergency period itself, sent him to Visakhapatnam. There he founded the student movement. While he was at Visakhapatnam, he completed a diploma in English and enrolled for Master of Arts in history. Up to December 1981, he was the office bearer for Students Federation of India. Completing his M.A. in distinction, he pursued a research in economics as scholar. Meanwhile, party secretary of the Visakhapatnam unit expired succumbing to ill health. Very shortly after his death, the new secretary died in a road accident. It turned on Raghavulu to take over as secretary checking his research. In 1994 he was elected as state secretary of the Centre for Indian Trade Unions (CITU). At the state conference of the party in December 1997 in Nalgonda, Raghavulu was elected as the state secretary of the party, and remained in that office till March 2014, when two committees were formed for Andhra Pradesh and Telangana, following the decision of bifurcation of the state.

Family life
Raghavulu married S. Punyavathi, one of his co-activists while he was doing his research at the Andhra University in Visakhapatnam. Punyavathi is now the state vice president of the Centre of Indian Trade Unions and was the  general secretary of All India Democratic Women's Association. The couple are blessed with a daughter, Srujana who is married to Mohammed Zaheer her co-student at Jawaharlal Nehru University (JNU) of Delhi.

References

External links

Communist Party of India (Marxist) politicians from Andhra Pradesh
Living people
People from Prakasam district
20th-century Indian historians
Trade unionists from Andhra Pradesh
Scholars from Andhra Pradesh
Year of birth missing (living people)